The Lomyen bent-toed gecko (Cyrtodactylus lomyenensis) is a species of gecko that is endemic to central Laos.

References

Cyrtodactylus
Reptiles described in 2010